Broadford is a Gaelic Athletic Association (GAA) club in County Kildare, Ireland, winners of two senior hurling and 16 senior camogie titles. It enlists players from a radius of twenty miles from the Boyne bridge in Edenderry, Leinster bridge in Clonard, Blackwater bridge in Enfield and Barney Bridge in Allenwood. Mick Moore was selected at full-forward on the Kildare hurling team of the millennium.

History
Balyna (described in 1908 as the only purely hurling club in the county) and Moyvalley were affiliated in 1907. Garriskar also competed in the 1910s and Johnstownbridge in the 1920s and 1930s. Broadford affiliated in 1923 but had been in existence for three years beforehand, winning a gold medal tournament in Meath with seven Bourkes on the team. Patsy Loughrey was one of the founding fathers, and Father James organised a house to house collection that yielded IR£2 10s. for the club's first set of jerseys. Dermot Bourke, brother of dual All Ireland medalist Frank, was responsible for re-organising the club after it regarded junior in 1950. Bourke played for 34 years before collecting a county medal in 1960, scoring one of Broadford’s goals in the final.

Gaelic Football
Broadford hurlers play Gaelic football with Clogherinkoe, Johnstownbridge or Carbury.

Hurling
The club were beaten in 11 county finals before they won the double in 1960 and 1961 defeating Military College on home ground in Thomastown. Fourteen Carbury natives fielded with Broadford while Military College had five inter-county players and no Kildare natives. Broadford won by 3-2 to 1-5. Joe Costigan, Pat and John Cummins, Ted Duffy and John Ennis were all participants in the victory. Broadford repeated the act a year later, when they beat their predecessors as county champions, Athy, by three points.

Camogie
Founded in 1967, the club dominated camogie in Kildare between 1978 and 1993, beating Carbury 10-15 to nil in the 1991 final and winning Leinster junior club title in 1987. In all they won 16 senior and two junior championships. Miriam Malone-Miggin is considered the county’s greatest camogie player.

Honours
 Kildare Senior Hurling Championship Winners (2) 1960, 1961
 Kildare Senior Hurling League: (1) 1988
 Kildare Senior Hurling Championship Finalists 1925, 1936, 1934, 1941, 1942, 1944, 1957, 1958, 1963, 1964, 1969
 Kildare Junior/Intermediate Hurling Championship  (6) 1939, 1956, 1976, 1981, 1987, 2002
 Kildare Junior Hurling Championship Finalists (9) 1950, 1952, 1953, 1955, 1962, 1969, 1970, 1972, 1973, 1987
 Kildare Junior Hurling League (3) 1974, 1976, 1981
 Leinster Junior Camogie Championship (1) 1987
 Kildare Senior Camogie Championship 1969, 1970, 1971, 1973, 1979, 1982, 1983, 1984, 1985, 1986, 1987, 1988, 1989, 1990, 1991,1993..
 Kildare Junior Camogie Championship (1) 1967
 Kildare Senior Camogie League (14) 1968, 1969, 1970, 1971, 1972, 1973, 1980, 1982, 1983, 1987, 1988, 1992, 1993
 Kildare girls Junior champions (1)  2008

Bibliography
 Kildare GAA: A Centenary History, by Eoghan Corry, CLG Chill Dara, 1984,  hb  pb
 Kildare GAA yearbook, 1972, 1974, 1978, 1979, 1980 and 2000- in sequence especially the Millennium yearbook of 2000
 Soaring Sliothars: Centenary of Kildare Camogie 1904-2004 by Joan O'Flynn Kildare County Camogie Board.

External links
Kildare GAA site
Kildare GAA club sites
Kildare on Hoganstand.com
Broadford GAA on GaelicGames.In

Gaelic games clubs in County Kildare
Hurling clubs in County Kildare